Participant Media, LLC is an American film production company founded in 2004 by Jeffrey Skoll, dedicated to entertainment intended to spur social change. The company finances and co-produces film and television content, as well as digital entertainment through its subsidiary SoulPancake, which the company acquired in 2016.

The company was originally named Participant Productions and went on to become a well-known independent financier. The company's name descriptively politicizes its basis on currently topical subjects presented to induce awareness of problematic social aspects.

The company has produced, financed, or co-produced over 100 films. Its films have been nominated for 73 Academy Awards, and have won 18, including Best Picture for Green Book and Spotlight.

Participant, which earned B Corp certification in 2017, is the largest company that exclusively produces and finances social impact entertainment.

History

Founding and early investments
The company was founded in January 2004 as Participant Productions by Jeffrey Skoll, the "second employee" of eBay, with $100 million in cash from his  personal funds. Its goal was to produce projects that would be both commercially viable and socially relevant.

Skoll was the company's first chief executive officer, but stepped down in August 2006. The firm's initial plans were to produce four to six films per year, each with a budget of $40 million. It focused on films in six areas the environment, health care, human rights, institutional responsibility, peace and tolerance, and social and economic justice. It evaluated projects by running them past its creative executives first, only then assessing their cost and commercial viability, and  analyzing their social relevance last. Once the decision was made to go ahead with production, the company asked non-profit organizations to build campaigns around the release. In some cases, the studio has spent years creating positive word-of-mouth with advocacy groups, which are often encouraged to use the film to push their own agendas.

The new company quickly announced an ambitious slate of productions. Its first film was the drama film American Gun (2005), with equity partner IFC Films. Two weeks later, the company announced a co-production deal with Warner Bros. on two filmsthe geopolitical thriller film Syriana (2005) and the drama film Class Action (later re-titled North Country) (2005). Participant Productions contributed half the budget of each film. Its fourth production, a documentary film, was announced in November 2004. Titled The World According to Sesame Street (2005), the film examined the impact of the children's television show Sesame Street on world culture, focusing on Kosovo, Bangladesh, South Africa and El Salvador. At the same time, the company began to implement an environmentally friendly strategy: Syriana was the company's first carbon-neutral production, and the company created carbon offsets for the documentary film An Inconvenient Truth (2006).

First films and financial problems, maturing growth

In 2005, the company suffered its first stumble. It again agreed to co-finance a picture with Warner Bros., Vadim Perelman's second feature, Truce. Although Perelman claimed he had "never been moved by a script to such an extent", the film never went into production. North Country did poorly at the box office despite recent Academy Award-winner Charlize Theron in the lead. The World According to Sesame Street never found a distributor for theatrical release, and eventually only aired on PBS television, Sesame Street'''s broadcast home.

The company announced in March 2005 that it would executive produce the Warner Bros. drama film Good Night, and Good Luck. At the Cannes Film Festival in May, the company bought the right to distribute the forthcoming drama film Fast Food Nation (2006)  directed by Richard Linklater in North America in return for an equity stake."Who's Really Who in Cannes". Variety. May 14, 2006. A month later, it bought distribution rights to the documentary  Murderball in return for an equity stake. It also executive produced and co-financed Al Gore's global-warming documentary, An Inconvenient Truth.Snyder, Gabriel (December 18, 2005). "Searchlight Craves 'Food'". Variety.Cohen, David S. (January 18, 2007). "Stanley Kramer Award: An Inconvenient Truth". Variety.

As heavier production scheduling grew, the company added staff. Ricky Strauss was named the first president in March 2005, with oversight of production, marketing and business development. Attorney and former non-profit chief executive Meredith Blake was hired in June as its Senior Vice President of Corporate and Community Affairs, to oversee development of awareness and outreach campaigns around the social issues raised in the company's films in cooperation with non-profit organizations, corporations, and earned media. Diane Weyermann, director of the Sundance Institute's Documentary Film Program, joined the company in October 2005 as Executive Vice President of Documentary Production.

The company's non-film-production efforts continued to grow. The company provided an undisclosed amount of financing in February 2005 to film distributor Emerging Pictures to finance that company's national network of digitally equipped cinemas (with Emerging Pictures distributing Participant's films). The company also began its first socially relevant outreach project, helping to finance screenings of the biographical film Gandhi (1982) in the Palestinian territories for the first time as well as in the countries of Israel, Jordan, Lebanon and Syria. In support of its upcoming film, An Inconvenient Truth, the studio negotiated a deal for distributor Paramount Classics to donate five percent of its U.S. domestic theatrical gross box-office receipts (with a guarantee of $500,000) to the Alliance for Climate Protection.

The company had a very successful 2005 awards season, with eleven Academy Award nominations and one win. Good Night, and Good Luck garnered six nominations, including Best Art Direction, Best Cinematography, Best Director (George Clooney), Best Picture, Best Actor in a Leading Role (David Strathairn) and Best Original Screenplay. Murderball was nominated for Best Documentary Feature. North Country was nominated for Best Actress in a Leading Role (Charlize Theron) and Best Actress in a Supporting Role (Frances McDormand). Syriana was nominated for Best Actor in a Supporting Role (George Clooney) and Best Original Screenplay. But of the eleven nominations, only George Clooney won for Best Actor in a Supporting Role in Syriana.

Film line-up addition and continued growth

In June, the company announced it would partner with New Line Cinema (a subsidiary of Warner Bros.) to produce The Crusaders, a drama about Brown v. Board of Education of Topeka, 347 U.S. 483 (1954), a landmark ruling of the Supreme Court of the United States which ended racial segregation in public schools. But the film never got beyond the development stage.

In September, the company entered into an agreement to co-produce the drama film The Visitor (2008) with Groundswell Productions, and two months later agreed to co-produce (with Sony Pictures Classics) a documentary film about the Abu Ghraib torture scandal, Standard Operating Procedure (2008), directed by Errol Morris.

The company also took an equity position in and a co-production credit for Chicago 10 (2007), an animated documentary film about the 1969 Chicago Seven conspiracy trial.Morfoot, Addie (November 17, 2008). "Helmers Put Talking Heads Through Toon Filter". Daily Variety.

Finally, in December, the company agreed to finance and produce the documentary film Man from Plains (2007), directed by Jonathan Demme, that followed former U.S. President Jimmy Carter as he promoted his political-science book, Palestine: Peace Not Apartheid (2006).

The company also co-financed, with Warner Independent Pictures, the documentary film Darfur Now (2007), and, with Universal Studios and others, co-financed the biographical film Charlie Wilson's War (2007). The film had the biggest budget of any of the company's films since Syriana.

Three major corporate events also occurred in 2006.

 In September, Skoll stepped down as the company's chief executive officer and was replaced by James Berk, the founding executive director of the National Academy of Recording Arts and Sciences Foundation and former president and chief executive officer of Hard Rock Cafe International. Berk's duties included daily operations and management, earned media efforts and corporate branding.
 In December, the company won its first significant award when the Producers Guild of America presented the 2007 Stanley Kramer Award to An Inconvenient Truth.McNary, Dave (December 5, 2006). "'Truth' Is Served at PGAs". Variety.
 The company was also one of the backers in April 2006 which invested $1 billion in Summit Entertainment, allowing that company to restructure itself as a full-fledged film studio.McClintock, Pamela (January 22, 2009). "Participant Reaches for the Summit". Daily Variety. This did not become known, however, for near three years.

The company's success continued through the 2006 awards season. An Inconvenient Truth was nominated for an Academy Award for Best Documentary Feature, and the song "I Need to Wake Up" (by Melissa Etheridge) nominated for an Academy Award for Best Original Song. The film and song won their respective categories in February 2007.Gorman, Steve (February 26, 2007). "Gore's 'Inconvenient Truth' Wins Documentary Oscar". Reuters. Retrieved July 10, 2012.

Corporate growth continued in 2007. On January 8, the company hired motion-picture marketing veterans Buffy Shutt and Kathy Jones, both Executive Vice President of Marketing, to coordinate marketing of the company's films. Eight days later, the company hired Tony Award- and Emmy Award-winning event producer John Schreiber as Executive Vice President of Social Action and Advocacy to enhance the company's earned media, non-profit and corporate outreach and advocacy campaigns.

February saw the hire of Adrian Sexton as Executive Vice President to oversee digital and global media projects, and April saw veteran production head Jonathan King join the company as Executive Vice President of Production. Lynn Hirshfield was hired in May as Vice President of Business Development to launch the company's publishing division, and saw Bonnie Abaunza and Liana Schwarz both Vice President of Social Action Campaign Development and Operations to assist with social outreach and advocacy campaigns in mid-June.

In November, the company signed a deal with actress Natalie Portman's newly formed production company, Handsomecharlie Films, under which the two studios would co-produce socially relevant films for a two-year period. No films were produced under this agreement, however. The same month, the company hired veteran Showtime producer John Moser to oversee development and production of original programs for television and home cable. But despite the management activity and expansion, not all of the company's films did well. Chicago 10 did not sell for several months after it premiered at Sundance, and only significant editing and a reduction in running time led to a distribution deal.

The company also announced additional productions. In January, it said it was co-financing the drama film The Kite Runner (2007) with Sidney Kimmel Entertainment and DreamWorks Pictures, the latter company then owned by Viacom via Paramount Pictures. The Kite Runner was the first collaboration between both Participant and DreamWorks; the two companies would not collaborate again until The Help in 2011. That spring, the company took an equity position in Angels in the Dust (2007), a documentary film about children orphaned by AIDS, and paid the filmmaker to update the film and shoot more footage.

In April, it closed a deal with Warner Independent to turn Randy Shilts' biographical book, The Mayor of Castro Street (1982) into a film, but the project entered development hell, as well as the feature-length documentary about the 2007 Live Earth concert later. Five months later the company agreed   (with Broken Lizard) to co-produce and co-finance the company's first comedy film, Taildraggers, revolving around five pilots trying to stop oil extraction from an Alaskan preserve. As of June 2009, however, the film had not been produced.

Participant then signed a co-production deal with State Street Pictures to finance the biographical drama, Bobby Martinez about the eponymous Latino surfer in November. The film entered development hell for nearly two years but hired Ric Roman Waugh to rewrite and direct in April 2009, with supposed production by the beginning of 2012. By the end of 2007, the company was seen as a key player in documentary production.

Name change, more political outreach
In March 2008, Participant Productions changed its name to Participant Media to reflect the firm's expansion into television and non-traditional entertainment media.

The company continued to expand its social advocacy and outreach efforts in 2008. On January 16, 2008, it joined and made a financial contribution to a $100 million United Nations-sponsored fund which would provide backing for films which combatted religious, ethnic, racial, and other stereotypes. Fueling the company's expansion was the creation of a $250 million fund with Image Nation, a start-up film studio based in the United Arab Emirates which is a division of the Abu Dhabi Media Company. Each company contributed roughly half of the fund's total (although some funding came from loans). Participant and Image Nation agreed to produce 18 films over the next five years, which would add approximately four feature-length films per year to Participant's existing slate."Dealmakers Impact Report '08." Variety. September 25, 2008. To boost its marketing efforts, the company also hired Jeffrey Sakson as Vice President of Publicity in April 2008. In September 2008, Participant Media and PublicAffairs Books signed a deal under which PublicAffairs would publish four original paperback books designed to expand upon the social messages in Participant's films. The first book to be published under the pact was Food Inc.: A Participant Guide: How Industrial Food Is Making Us Sicker, Fatter, and Poorer—And What You Can Do About It. The company also founded a new Web site, TakePart.com, to promote Participant Media's films as well as make viewers aware of the social advocacy efforts of Participant's outreach partners. In 2009, the company signed a first look deal with Summit Entertainment.

In March, Participant announced a co-financing deal with Tapestry Films to produce Minimum Wage, a comedy about a corrupt corporate executive sentenced to live for a year on a minimum wage salary. It was not produced. A month later, the company announced it and Groundswell Productions were co-financing The Informant!, a comedy directed by Steven Soderbergh and starring Matt Damon about the lysine price-fixing conspiracy at Archer Daniels Midland in the mid-1990s.Stewart, Sharon; Dawtrey, Adam; Kaufman, Anthony; and Ross, Matthew. "Got Liquidity?" Variety. May 11, 2009. July saw Participant set up a co-financing deal with three other studios to produce The Colony, an eco-horror film. It, too, was never produced.

The 2007 awards season saw several more Academy Award nominations for the company's films. Its films had a combined seven Golden Globe Award nominations, although it won none. Philip Seymour Hoffman was nominated for his supporting actor role in Charlie Wilson's War, Richard Jenkins was nominated for Best Actor in The Visitor, and Alberto Iglesias was nominated for best original score for The Kite Runner. But the studio won no Oscars that year. The success during awards season did not extend into 2008. The company had only three films released during the year (Every Little Step, Pressure Cooker, and Standard Operating Procedure), and none of them was nominated for an award from a major arts organization. However, on November 19, 2008, the Producers Guild of America gave Participant founder Jeff Skoll its Visionary Award.

In 2009, it saw the company continue to aggressively produce both feature films and documentaries. In January, it announced that it would produce Paul Dinello's Mr. Burnout (about a burned out teacher seeking to rekindle his love of teaching) and Furry Vengeance (a comedy starring Brendan Fraser about an Oregon real estate developer who is opposed by animals).Fleming, Michael (January 27, 2009). "Fraser Letting Fur Fly For Pic". Daily Variety. But only Furry Vengeance was produced. That same month Participant signed a five-year production and distribution deal with Summit Entertainment. The agreement, which covered titles financed by Participant's $250 million production agreement with Imagination Media, was nonexclusive (meaning Participant could seek distribution of films by other companies) and was limited to four projects a year. The agreement allowed Summit to charge a distribution fee, and to co-finance titles if it wished. The pact covered home video and pay-television distribution as well. Furry Vengeance was the first picture produced under the agreement. In April, the company hired screenwriter Miles Chapman to pen an untitled environmentally themed action-adventure script about the hunt for a mystical gem in the heart of Africa. The script went into development hell. The same month, the company agreed to co-finance (with Krasnoff/Foster Entertainment) a biographical drama titled History on Trial—which was intended to document the true story of Deborah Lipstadt, a professor of Jewish studies who was sued by Holocaust deniers David Irving for libel.Freedland, Jonathan (February 5, 2000). "Court 73 – Where History Is on Trial". The Guardian.Lyall, Sarah (January 12, 2000). "London Trial Opens Dispute on Rewriting the Holocaust". The New York Times.Lyall, Sarah (April 12, 2000). "Critic of a Holocaust Denier Is Cleared in British Libel Suit". The New York Times.Reid, T.R. (April 6, 2000). "Historians Fight Battle of the Books". The Washington Post.Reid, T.R. (April 12, 2000). "U.S. Scholar Is Victorious in Holocaust Libel Trial". The Washington Post. The film was not produced, but the company did go on to make Denial, starring Rachel Weisz, about the same subject in 2016. The company also announced a number of productions in May 2009, including: The Crazies, a remake of the 1973 film of the same name; Casino Jack and the United States of Money, a film about the Jack Abramoff Indian lobbying scandal; Help Me Spread Goodness, a comedy starring and directed by Ben Stiller about a banking executive who is caught by a Nigerian Internet scam (the film was not produced);Fleming, Michael (May 4, 2009). "Stiller Falls for Scam". Daily Variety. and The Soloist, a drama starring Jamie Foxx and Robert Downey, Jr. based on the true story of Nathaniel Ayers, a brilliant musician who develops schizophrenia and becomes homeless.

The company also expanded in non-film production as well. In March, Participant agreed to conduct outreach and social advocacy efforts on behalf of the Lionsgate/Roadside Attractions documentary The Cove about dolphin slaughters by Japanese villagers in a cove near fishing grounds. The firm's TakePart website also released a new iPhone application, Givabit, which solicits charitable donations for Participant Media's nonprofit advocacy partners from iPhone users once a day. In June, the company established a new book publishing subsidiary, headed by Vice President of Publishing Lynn Hirshfield (who changed titles within the company).DiOrio, Carl. "Lynn Hirshfield Upped at Participant." The Hollywood Reporter. June 8, 2009. Liana Schwarz was promoted to Senior Vice President of Campaign Development and Operations.

On September 16, the company signed an agreement with Submarine Entertainment under which they would handle North American sales of upcoming documentaries and act as a consultant on worldwide sales of its documentaries.

On January 28, 2010, Participant Media co-presented director Mark Lewis' documentary, Cane Toads: The Conquest at the Sundance Film Festival. The film, according to Daily Variety said, was the "first specialty doc filmed in digital 3D." A month later, Bonnie Stylides left Summit Entertainment to become Participant's Senior Vice-President of Business Affairs. The studio's hit documentary, Waiting for "Superman", garnered media acclaim, and Participant inked a worldwide distribution deal with Paramount shortly before its premiere at Sundance. It also sold North American distribution rights for its documentary, Countdown to Zero, to Magnolia Pictures, and distribution rights to its documentary Climate of Change to Tribeca Film (a division of Robert De Niro's Tribeca Enterprises).

The company also received a $248,000 grant from the Robert Wood Johnson Foundation to raise awareness about access to quality food and childhood obesity. The studio used these funds to create a campaign linked to its promotional efforts for the documentary film Food, Inc. and signed a deal with Active Media to help run the campaign. It    signed a deal with Planet Illogica (a website collaboratively produced by artists, filmmakers, musicians, and fashion designers) to generate a social action campaign associated with its documentary Oceans (which was released by Walt Disney Pictures). The "Save My Oceans Tour" involved concerts, art installations, and screenings of Oceans on college campuses.

On April 13, Noah Manduke (former president of the consulting firm Durable Good and president of the marketing firm Siegel + Gale) was named chief strategy officer of the Jeff Skoll Group. Skoll created the Skoll Group to oversee his various enterprises, including Participant Media, and Manduke began working with Skoll and Participant Media's top management to begin a strategic planning process and strengthen collaboration between Participant and Skoll's other organizations and companies. The following month, studio executive James Berk was one of only 180 individuals invited to join the Academy of Motion Picture Arts and Sciences.

Based on the success of its Twilight Saga film series, Summit Entertainment announced on March 8, 2011, that it was making a $750 million debt refinancing with cash distribution to its investors, which included Participant Media.

On June 5, The New York Times ran a major story  about the studio, declaring: "Participant Media, the film industry's most visible attempt at social entrepreneurship, turned seven this year without quite sorting out whether a company that trades in movies with a message can earn its way in a business that has been tough even for those who peddle 3-D pandas and such." Author Michael Cieply noted that The Beaver, Participant's latest released, cost $20 million but had garnered just $1 million in gross box-office sales after a month in theaters making the film a "flop". The company's biggest success to date, the newspaper noted, was 2007's Charlie Wilson's War ($66.7 million in gross domestic box office revenue). Skoll was quoted as saying that he had poured "hundreds of millions to date [into the company], with much more to follow", and that the studio had yet to break even. Skoll and Berk, however, noted that Participant Media performs slightly above-average when compared to similarly-sized peers. The advantage came in three areas: home video sales, the company's long-term attempts to build social movements around its films, and its stake in Summit Entertainment (which allowed it to win more favorable distribution terms).

The Times said that audiences may be turned off by Participant's relentless focus on upsetting issues, quoting unnamed sources. The company hoped that it would change this attitude about its films (and make money) with 2011's The Help (about racial reconciliation in the American South during the 1960s) and Contagion (a Steven Soderbergh picture about the outbreak of a virulent, deadly disease). Skoll also said that Participant had purchased the rights to a New York Times article about the Deepwater Horizon oil spill of 2010, and that the film would likely focus not simply on oil drilling but on a number of critical issues (such as climate change and the ecological health of oceans).

By year's end, however, there was less concern about the company's financial future. The studio's $25 million film about racial reconciliation (about a third of the production budget came from Participant), The Help, cleared $100 million in late August, and was just short of $200 million worldwide by late December. The Help was the first film since 2010's Inception to be number one at the North American box office for three straight weekends in a row, and was only unseated by another Participant Media film, Contagion. The Help was nominated for four Academy Awards: The film for Best Picture, Viola Davis for Best Actress, and Jessica Chastain and Octavia Spencer for Best Supporting Actress. Spencer won the Oscar for her role.

Participant executives said on October 14, 2011 that the studio would expand its production to make seven to twelve films a year, would begin producing features and series for television, and expand its online presence. As part of this plan, in November the studio hired advertising executive Chad Boettcher to be executive vice president for social action and advocacy and 20th Century Fox executive Gary Frenkel to be senior vice president for digital products and communities.

In January 2012, Participant Media made its first investment in a non-English-language film, the forthcoming Pablo Larraín motion picture No (starring Gael Garcia Bernal). The semi-biographical film tells the story of a man who initiates an upbeat, innocuous advertising campaign that helps to unseat Chilean dictator General Augusto Pinochet during the 1988 plebiscite that led to the Chilean transition to democracy. The same month, however, it lost its president, Ricky Strauss, who departed the studio to become head of worldwide marketing at Walt Disney Pictures.

Three weeks later, on February 2, 2012, Participant Media announced that it was partnering with Summit Entertainment, Image Nation, Spanish production company Apaches Entertainment, and Colombian production company Dynamo to produce a supernatural horror film about an American oil company executive who moves his family into a house in a small city in Colombia only to find the home is haunted. The company announced that Spanish director Luis Quilez would direct from a script by Alex and David Pastor (who developed their script with funding from Participant).

On April 16, Participant formed Participant Television, its television division, with the naming of its president, Evan Shapiro. Participant also took an equity stake in Cineflix Media Canada-based TV producer and distributor. In December, Participant continued its move into television with the purchase of the Documentary Channel (USA) and Halogen TV's distribution assets to be combined into a new cable channel within its TV division.

On January 10, 2013, Participant Media's Lincoln received 12 Academy Award nominations. These included Best Picture, Best Director (Steven Spielberg), Best Actor (Daniel Day-Lewis), Best Supporting Actress (Sally Field), and Best Adapted Screenplay (Tony Kushner).

The following month, Participant Media launched a Latin American production division, Participant PanAmerica, to co-finance Spanish-language films with Mexican producers. The plan calls for 12 films to be made under this division over a five-year period.

Participant Media's new millennial targeted cable channel, Pivot, launched on August 1, 2013.

On January 24, 2015 its documentary 3 ½ Minutes', Ten Bullets premiered at the Sundance Film Festival and won the U.S. Documentary Special Jury Award for Social Impact.

On February 22, 2015 the company won the Academy Award for Best Feature Documentary with itstheir film CITIZENFOUR.

On March 21, 2015, Participant's documentary The Look of Silence won the Audience Award: Festival Favorites category. CITIZENFOUR, The Great Invisible, Ivory Tower, and The Unknown Known were nominated for a total of seven 2015 Primetime Emmy Awards, where CITIZENFOUR won for Exceptional Merit in Documentary Film.

David Linde leads as CEO
On October 13, 2015, the company announced David Linde joined Participant as CEO.

On December 16, the company and Steven Spielberg with Reliance Entertainment and Entertainment One created Amblin Partners.

On February 28, 2016, the company won its first Best Picture Academy Award for Spotlight. The acclaimed drama also picked up the Oscar for Best Original Screenplay (Tom McCarthy and Josh Singer). Also in February 2016, the company's films The Look of Silence and Beasts of No Nation won a total of three Independent Spirit Awards.

On October 13, 2016, the company acquired SoulPancake, a short-form and digital brand, for an undisclosed price. On October 31, 2016, the company shut down TV network Pivot due to low ratings and small viewing audiences. At the end of 2016, the company shut down TakePart as part of a shifting strategy.

On January 10, 2017, Participant announced its partnership with Lionsgate to distribute films internationally. Soon after, the company's film Deepwater Horizon was nominated for two Academy Awards in 2017. Later that same year, Participant Media released its film Wonder on November 17. The film, starring Jacob Tremblay, Owen Wilson and Julia Roberts, became Participant's highest-grossing film at the worldwide box office.

In 2018, the company's film The Post was nominated for two Academy Awards, Wonder was nominated for one Academy Award, and Participant's A Fantastic Woman won the Academy Award for Best Foreign Language Film. That same year, Participant's film Roma was named Best Picture by the Los Angeles Film Critics Association and the New York Film Critics Circle. The film also won the Golden Lion for Best Film at the Venice Film Festival. The company's film Green Book was named Best Film by the National Board of Review and won the People's Choice Award at the Toronto International Film Festival. In 2018, Participant Media also expanded its virtual reality experience, “Melting Ice” featuring Al Gore, into a four-part series titled, This is Climate Change.

In 2019, Participant received a company-record 17 Academy Award nominations including ten for Roma, five for Green Book and two for RBG. Of those 17 nominations, the company won six Oscars including Best Picture for Green Book and Best Director and Best Foreign Language Film for Roma.

The success of Roma'' led to a cultural moment in 2019 called the “Roma Effect,” which helped increase visibility and raise awareness for domestic workers in the U.S. and Mexico, where the Mexican Congress voted to pass legislation granting domestic workers access to basic labor rights, such as limited work hours and paid vacation.

In collaboration with the UCLA School of Theater, Film and Television's Skoll Center for Social Impact Entertainment, Participant published the "State of SIE" report, similar to what it had done a few years earlier with USC when it published the "Participant Index" report. These reports are rare exceptions to Participant Media usually keeping its impact strategies proprietary.

On September 8, 2019, Participant debuted its rebrand and logo at the Toronto Film Festival which coincided with the company's 15th anniversary. The company's rebrand was followed by the announcement that David Linde extended his contract as CEO of the consumer-engaged brand with a multi-year deal.

On November 30, 2020, Participant terminated its equity stake in Amblin Partners, ending its relationship with the company.

Films

Television

See also

 List of California companies
 List of film production companies by country

References

External links
 

 
Documentary film production companies
Film production companies of the United States
Film distributors of the United States
Companies based in Los Angeles
Mass media companies established in 2004
2004 establishments in California
American independent film studios
B Lab-certified corporations